The Smiling, Proud Wanderer is a Hong Kong wuxia television series adapted from Louis Cha's novel of the same title, starring Chow Yun-fat and Rebecca Chan. It was first broadcast on TVB Jade in Hong Kong from in 1984.

Cast

 Note: Some of the characters' names are in Cantonese romanisation.

 Chow Yun-fat as Ling-wu Chung
 Rebecca Chan as Yam Ying-ying
 Jaime Chik as Ngok Ling-san
 Kenneth Tsang as Ngok But-kwan
 Stephen Tung as Lam Ping-chi
 Bak Yan as Ning Chung-chak
 Kong Ngai as Dong-fong Bat-bai
 Lau Siu-ming as Yam Ngor-hang
 Lau Kong as Fung Ching-yeung
 Lau Dan as Tin Bak-kwong
 Isabella Wong as Yee-lam
 Yeung Chak-lam as Tso Lang-sim
 Chan Fuk-sang as Lam Fung-wong
 Kwan Hoi-san as Lam Chan-nam
 Nam Hong as Lam Chan-nam's wife
 Simon Yam as Lau Ching-fung
 Ma Chung-tak as Heung Man-tin
 Felix Lok as Yu Chong-hoi
 Andy Doi as Lo Duk-lok
 Shih Kien as Wong Yuen-ba
 Bonnie Wong as Ding-yik
 Soh Hang-suen as Ding-yin
 Pui Wan as Ding-ching
 Bak Man-biu as Fong-ching
 Yu Tze-ming as Chung-heoi
 Chun Wong as Muk Ko-fung
 Cheng Siu-ping as Mute Granny
 Tam Chuen-hing as Yeung Lin-ting
 Kam Kwok-wai as Kuk Yeung
 Law Kwok-wai as Ping Yat-chi
 Yip Tin-hang as Monk Bat-kei
 Chu Siu-bo as Kuk Fei-yin
 Lau Kwok-shing as Luk-juk-yung
 Oscar Lam as Cheung-ching-tze
 Ng Yip-kwong as Tin-mun
 Ko Hung as Mok Dai
 Ng Man-tat as Wong Chung-gung
 Lam Man-wai as Hak-bak-tze
 Mak Ho-wai as Tou-bat-yung
 Tsui Kwong-lam as Dan-ching-sang
 Sandra Ng as Cousin Kwan
 Bobby Tsang as Luk Dai-yau
 Chu Kong as Lou-tau-tze
 Kwok Fung as Tso Chin-chau
 Lo Kwok-wai as Gai Mo-sze
 Eddie Kwan as Heung Dai-nin
 Sean Lau as Mai Wai-yi 
 Bobby Au-yeung as Yu Chong-hoi's son
 Lawrence Ng as Lau Ching-fung's son
 Kiki Sheung as Lau Ching-fung's daughter
 Wong Chung-tze as Wong Ka-chun
 Wilson Lam as Wong Ka-keoi
 Ho Bik-kin as Master Yik
 Albert Law as Lam Yuen-to
 Kwan Ching as Ngok So
 Wong Yat-fei as Choi Tze-fung
 Chu Tit-wo as Sheung-koon Wun
 Lam Tin as Tung Bak-hung
 Ho Kwong-lun, Long Tin-sang, Chan Kwok-kuen, Chan Dik-hak, Chun Hung and Cheng Fan-sang as the Six Immortals of the Peach Valley

External links

The Smiling, Proud Wanderer at the Chinese Movie Database

TVB dramas
Works based on The Smiling, Proud Wanderer
Hong Kong wuxia television series
Martial arts television series
Hong Kong action television series
1984 Hong Kong television series debuts
1984 Hong Kong television series endings
Television series set in Imperial China
Cantonese-language television shows
Television shows based on works by Jin Yong